Disruption is ending an adoption. While technically an adoption is disrupted only when it is abandoned by the adopting parent or parents before it is legally completed (an adoption that is reversed after that point is instead referred to in the law as having been dissolved), in practice the term is used for all adoptions that are ended (more recently, among families disrupting, the euphemism "re-homing" has become current). It is usually initiated by the parents via a court petition, much like a divorce, to which it is analogous.

While rarely discussed in public, even within the adoption community, the practice has become far more widespread in recent years, especially among those parents who have adopted from Eastern European countries, particularly Russia and Romania, where some children have suffered far more from their institutionalization than their parents were led to believe.

Reasons for disruption

Despite the intense and careful screening that most who wish to adopt children must go through, sometimes the adoption does not succeed. The child may have developmental or psychological issues that the parents cannot handle, had not been informed of prior to the adoption, or both. Or the parents may have had unrealistic expectations of the child, and they just may not get along.  The adoptive parents themselves may have psychological or family issues themselves that led them down the path to adopt.  These adoptive parents adopt thinking that the new child in their life will somehow enhance their life.

Aftermath of disruption

A child who is disrupted is usually put first into foster care, pending placement with a new family, unless they reach the age of 18 and legally become adults before this happens. In more and more recent disruptions, however, the disrupting adopters have been in direct contact with a family wishing to adopt and the child can be directly adopted by the new family.

Some adoption agencies and facilitators have even begun specializing in post-disruption placements.

If the child was placed privately, either through a lawyer or an adoption agency, that party is usually required by law to ensure a second placement of the child. However, that requirement is not always enforced, and many parents of Eastern European adoptees in particular have found their agencies to be of no help in finding a new home for their children.

Some don't find state social-services agencies to be much help either, since they're already so overwhelmed and they would have to pay child support. An underground, possibly illegal, network has arisen in the U.S. over the past decade to help these parents disrupt their adoptions, authorities believe. 
Some of the people in this have taken in large numbers of children at the same time and have sometimes been arrested for child abuse and neglect.

Attitudes toward disruption

Few parents who have disrupted adoptions have been willing to talk about the process, since it carries a strong social stigma. It is seen by many as essentially legally sanctioned abandonment, especially since there is no corresponding legal procedure available for biological parents who find their children beyond their ability to handle, apart from giving their children up for adoption.

Those who do disrupt and discuss it describe the experience as, unsurprisingly, extremely painful, almost like a death in the family, and shameful but ultimately worth it for both the parent and the child. This resolution, however, usually cannot be reached without undergoing extensive counseling and therapy.

High-profile disruptions

One of the rare public accounts of a disruption took place in 2000 when the CBS News program 48 Hours told the story of Jesse and Crystal Money, an Atlanta-area couple who ultimately decided to disrupt the adoption of their nine-year-old Russian-born daughter and return her to the orphanage in Moscow she had previously lived in. The girl had severe reactive attachment disorder and the family feared for their physical safety due to her increasing violence. Since the girl had not acquired U.S. citizenship, her treatment options for that were more limited than they might have been for a domestically-born child.

An Indonesian boy adopted by an Irish man, Joe Dowse, and his Azerbaijani wife, Lala. Tristan Dowse was abandoned at the Indonesian orphanage from where he had been obtained and adopted, when, according to the Dowses, the adoption "hadn't worked out."  At that stage, his adoption had been recognised by the Irish Adoption Board and he had been granted Irish citizenship.  He could only speak English. In 2005, investigative journalist Ann McElhinney and Irish Production Company Esras Films reunited the young boy with his natural mother, Suryani. The resulting documentary “The Search for Tristan's Mum” was broadcast by Irish television station RTÉ. In 2006, an Irish court ordered the Dowses to pay an immediate lump sum of €20,000 to Tristan, maintenance of €350 per month until he is 18 years of age, and a further lump sum of €25,000 when he reaches the age of 18. In addition, Tristan would remain an Irish citizen and enjoy all the rights to the Dowses’ estate. Tristan’s adoption was struck off the Register of Foreign Adoptions held by the Irish Adoption Board and Suryani was appointed his sole legal guardian.

In 2010, seven-year-old Artyom Savelyev/Justin Hansen's adoptive mother, Torry Ann Hansen, sent him back to Moscow alone with a note explaining why she no longer wanted him. After this incident, Russian Children's Ombudsman, Pavel Astakhov, said: "We must, as much as possible, keep our children in our country" and urged for more restrictions on international adoptions in Russia. The Chairwoman of the Russian parliamentary committee on family and children, Yelena Mizulina, pointed out that 30,000 children were sent back to institutions by their Russian adoptive, foster, or guardianship families in the last three years. She added: "Specialists call such a boom in returns a humanitarian catastrophe."

In 2020, it emerged that YouTubers Myka and James Stauffer had decided to "rehome" their child, Huxley, who was adopted by the couple from China in 2017. The Ohio-based couple had made popular videos on YouTube featuring their son which attracted millions of views. 27 of these videos were related to their "adoption journey", with one video titled "Huxley's EMOTIONAL Adoption VIDEO!! GOTCHA DAY China Adoption" having been viewed more than 5.5 million times. The couple was aware the child has mental disabilities before the adoption but had decided to proceed after "God softened [their] hearts". After medical professionals determined these disabilities specifically include autism and a brain cyst, the couple proceeded with rehoming when allegedly told "he needed a different fit".

Statistics

Since no records are kept or required to be kept of how many disruptions occur beyond those filed in court, which are confidential, there is no way to be sure how many are occurring. Anecdotal evidence, however, has suggested that while they may have decreased as a whole through 1997 (when the Adoption and Safe Families Act was passed), for adoptions of Eastern-European born children they may well have increased, and thus the rate may have stabilized.

A U.S. Department of Health and Human Services  review of what was known as of 2004 suggests that overall, 10-25% of adoptions are disrupted or dissolved, and that the rate tends to rise with the age of the child at adoption. It admitted that much data remains to be collected before any clear policies to prevent disruptions can be formulated and implemented.

A similar review in 2002 by the British Department for Education and Skills, done to lobby for changes in data collection procedures, also reported the lack of any centrally collected data

References

External links
Disrupted Placement Cases
Disruption at nurtureadopt.com.
Directory of disruption-related resources
Explanation of disruption process
.PDF on after care for disrupting parents and disrupted adoptees

Adoption law
Family disruption